Rendezvous with Kenton is an album by bandleader and pianist  Stan Kenton featuring performances recorded at the Rendezvous Ballroom in 1957 and released on the Capitol label.

Reception

The Allmusic review by Scott Yanow noted "The music is pleasant but not up to the fiery level one would expect of the Stan Kenton Orchestra".

Track listing
 "With the Wind and the Rain in Your Hair"(Jack Lawrence, Clara Edwards) - 2:02  
 "Memories of You" (Eubie Blake, Andy Razaf) - 2:34  
 "These Things You Left Me" (Harold Dickinson, Sidney Lippman) - 2:05  
 "Two Shades of Autumn" (Joe Coccia) - 3:53
 "They Didn't Believe Me" (Jerome Kern, Herbert Reynolds) - 1:53  
 "Walkin' by the River" (Robert Sour, Una Mae Carlisle) - 2:53
 "High on a Windy Hill" (Alex Kramer, Joan Whitney) - 2:07  
 "Love Letters" (Victor Young, Edward Heyman) - 2:24  
 "I Get Along Without You Very Well" (Hoagy Carmichael) - 1:55  
 "Desiderata" (Coccia) - 3:09  
 "This is No Laughing Matter" (Al Frisch, Buddy Kaye) - 3:29  
 "I See Your Face Before Me" (Arthur Schwartz, Howard Dietz) - 2:02  
Recorded at the Rendezvous Ballroom in Balboa, CA on October 7, 1957 (tracks 2, 3 & 12), October 8, 1957 (tracks 1, 4, 6 & 8-10), October 9, 1957 (tracks 7 & 11) and October 10, 1957 (track 5).

Personnel
Stan Kenton - piano, conductor
Billy Catalano, Phil Gilbert, Lee Katzman, Ed Leddy, Sam Noto - trumpet
Jim Amlotte, Kent Larsen, Archie Le Coque, Don Reed,  - trombone
Ken Shroyer  - bass trombone 
Lennie Niehaus, Bill Robinson - alto saxophone  
Wayne Dunstan, Bill Perkins - tenor saxophone  
Steve Perlow - baritone saxophone, alto saxophone
Red Kelly - bass 
Jerry McKenzie - drums 
Joe Coccia - arranger

References

Stan Kenton albums
1957 albums
Capitol Records albums
Albums conducted by Stan Kenton
Albums produced by Lee Gillette